Fritchton is an unincorporated community in Palmyra Township, Knox County, Indiana approximately 4 miles east of Vincennes, IN.

History
A post office was established at Fritchton in 1893, and remained in operation until it was discontinued in 1915. Emil H. Fritch served as postmaster. The high school was built in 1911 and closed in 1967. The school served grades 1 through 12.

Geography

References

Unincorporated communities in Knox County, Indiana
Unincorporated communities in Indiana